Lieutenant Commander William Edwin Hank (25 September 1902 – 14 November 1942) was an officer in the United States Navy during World War II.

Born at Norfolk, Virginia, Hank graduated from the Naval Academy in 1925.

Commissioned a lieutenant commander in 1940, Hank took control of Laffey (DD-459) 1 April 1942.  He received the Navy Cross for his skillful handling of the ship during the Battle of Cape Esperance. 

Hank received a second Navy Cross for heroism during the Naval Battle of Guadalcanal 12–13 November. As Laffey fought the Japanese battleship Hiei, she was sunk by large caliber gunfire and a torpedo. Lieutenant Commander Hank was reported missing and presumed dead 14 November. His ship received the Presidential Unit Citation and he was awarded his second Navy Cross.

References 

1902 births
1942 deaths
United States Navy officers
United States Navy personnel killed in World War II
Recipients of the Navy Cross (United States)